Matthew Phillip Dermody (born July 4, 1990) is an American professional baseball pitcher in the Boston Red Sox organization. He has previously played in Major League Baseball (MLB) for the Toronto Blue Jays and the Chicago Cubs, and in Nippon Professional Baseball (NPB) for the Saitama Seibu Lions and in the KBO League for the NC Dinos.

High school and college
Dermody attended Norwalk High School in his hometown of Norwalk, Iowa. In his senior season, he pitched to a 10–3 win–loss record, 1.26 earned run average (ERA), and 164 strikeouts. He also recorded the first six-inning, 18 strikeout perfect game in Iowa state history. In addition, Dermody hit .434 with 51 runs batted in (RBI). His pitching performance that year earned him the Bob Feller Pitching Award. Dermody was selected by the Pittsburgh Pirates in the 26th round of the 2009 Major League Baseball draft, but did not sign and instead attended the University of Iowa. With the Hawkeyes in 2010, Dermody made 10 appearances, seven of which were starts, and posted a 7.93 ERA. The following season he made 14 starts and went 4–6 with a 4.15 ERA and 75 strikeouts in 84 innings pitched. In 2010 and 2011, he played collegiate summer baseball with the Hyannis Harbor Hawks of the Cape Cod Baseball League. The Colorado Rockies drafted Dermody in the 29th round of the 2011 Major League Baseball draft, but he did not sign.

In 2012, Dermody won Iowa's Big Ten Sportsmanship Award, and pitched to a 1–7 record, 4.50 ERA, and 60 strikeouts in 76 innings. He was drafted for a third time, this time by the Arizona Diamondbacks in the 23rd round of the 2012 Major League Baseball draft. Dermody declared his intention to sign with the Diamondbacks, and went to Arizona for a physical examination. The Diamondbacks organization determined that he had a 40 percent tear of the left ulnar collateral ligament, and fearing the injury would require Tommy John surgery, declined to offer him a contract. Dermody then returned to the Hawkeyes for his senior year, making 14 starts in 2013. He had the best season of his college career, posting a 7–2 win–loss record, 3.64 ERA, and 68 strikeouts in 94 total innings.

Professional career

Toronto Blue Jays
The Toronto Blue Jays selected Dermody in the 28th round of the 2013 Major League Baseball draft, and he signed on June 14. He was assigned to the Rookie-level Gulf Coast League Blue Jays, where he made one scoreless relief appearance before being promoted to the Short Season-A Vancouver Canadians of the Northwest League. In 43 total innings that season, Dermody posed a 5–1 record, 1.66 ERA, and 51 strikeouts. In 2014, Dermody was promoted to the Class-A Lansing Lugnuts, where he pitched to a 4–6 record, 4.69 ERA, and 65 strikeouts in a career-high 96 innings. Dermody was assigned to the Advanced-A Dunedin Blue Jays for the 2015 season. In 77 total innings that season, he was 4–1 with a 4.21 ERA and 62 strikeouts.

Dermody remained in Dunedin to open the 2016 season, and made 16 relief appearances with a 1.96 ERA before being promoted to the Double-A New Hampshire Fisher Cats. He excelled at the Double-A level, making another 16 relief appearances and posting a 0.92 ERA, which led to his promotion to the Triple-A Buffalo Bisons.

On September 1, 2016, Dermody was called up by the Blue Jays. He made his MLB debut on September 3, 2016, against the Tampa Bay Rays. In relief of Joe Biagini, he pitched two-thirds of an inning, faced four batters, gave up two hits with no earned runs and got two outs while striking out one. Dermody wound up making 5 appearances with Toronto, failing to retire a batter in the final two en route to a 12.00 ERA. After the 2016 season, the Blue Jays assigned Dermody to the Mesa Solar Sox of the Arizona Fall League. On October 31, Dermody was named an AFL All-Star. He appeared in 10 games for Mesa and pitched to a 5.40 ERA with eight strikeouts.

On April 16, 2017, Dermody was recalled by the Blue Jays from the Buffalo Bisons. He was optioned back to Buffalo on April 17, recalled again on April 28, and sent back down on April 30. On March 21, 2018, Dermody was designated for assignment. He was outrighted to Triple-A Buffalo on March 24. Dermody underwent Tommy John surgery in May 2018. He was assigned to Triple-A Buffalo and put on the Injured list to start the 2019 season. He became a free agent following the 2019 season.

Sugar Land Skeeters
On March 9, 2020, Dermody signed with the Sugar Land Skeeters of the Atlantic League of Professional Baseball. However, the ALPB season was later canceled due to the COVID-19 pandemic. Dermody subsequently played for the Skeeters team of the Constellation Energy League (a makeshift four-team independent league created as a result of the pandemic) for the 2020 season. He was named to the league's all-star team.

Chicago Cubs
On August 6, 2020, Dermody was signed to a minor league contract by the Chicago Cubs organization. He was added to the team's major league roster on September 6, 2020, and pitched a scoreless inning in relief. Dermody was designated for assignment on September 7, 2020. Dermody elected free agency on September 28. On December 23, 2020, Dermody re-signed with the Cubs on a minor league contract. 

On January 19, 2021, Dermody was released by the Cubs organization.

Saitama Seibu Lions
On January 21, 2021, Dermody signed a one-year contract with the Saitama Seibu Lions of Nippon Professional Baseball (NPB). Appearing in 11 games, he pitched to an 0–2 record and 5.13 ERA with 22 strikeouts in 33.1 innings of work. He became a free agent following the 2021 season.

Chicago Cubs (second stint)
On January 27, 2022, Dermody signed a minor league contract with the Chicago Cubs organization. He appeared in 20 games (13 starts) for the Triple-A Iowa Cubs, logging a 6–3 record and 3.74 ERA with 70 strikeouts in 79.1 innings pitched.

NC Dinos
On August 8, 2022, Dermody signed with the NC Dinos of the KBO League. Dermody made eight starts for the Dinos, posting a 3–5 record and 4.54 ERA with 37 strikeouts in 39.2 innings pitched. He became a free agent following the 2022 season.

Boston Red Sox
On January 24, 2023, Dermody signed a minor league contract with the Boston Red Sox organization.

References

External links

1990 births
Living people
American expatriate baseball players in Canada
American expatriate baseball players in Japan
Baseball players from Iowa
Buffalo Bisons (minor league) players
Chicago Cubs players
Dunedin Blue Jays players
Gigantes del Cibao players
American expatriate baseball players in the Dominican Republic
Gulf Coast Blue Jays players
Hyannis Harbor Hawks players
Iowa Hawkeyes baseball players
Lansing Lugnuts players
Major League Baseball pitchers
Mesa Solar Sox players
New Hampshire Fisher Cats players 
Nippon Professional Baseball pitchers
People from Warren County, Iowa
Saitama Seibu Lions players
Sugar Land Skeeters players
Toronto Blue Jays players
Vancouver Canadians players